Völs may refer to:

Völs, Tyrol, a town in the district of Innsbruck-Land in Tyrol, Austria
Völs am Schlern, a town located in South Tyrol, Italy

Gerd Völs (born 1909), German Olympic rower